Chhari is an ancient village in  Mant Tehsil of Mathura district, Uttar Pradesh, India.

Transport  
Bhanirvan forest is about 30 kilometres away from Mathura city. The village is about 30 kilometres from Mathura City on the Raya-Naujhil road and two kilometres from Mant Tehsil. Buses, Tempo and many private vehicles are available. Bhadirvan only one kilometre from Chhari Village. Those with private vehicles can reach the temple by their own vehicle, otherwise, a distance of one kilometre from Chari village can be easily covered. The village situated on the road from Bajna to Raya, which is 2 km away from Mant Tehsil.

Tourist attraction  
Bhandirvan is very popular among Krishna reverent. Its known for Radha Krishna Vivah Sthali and Vanshivat where there is a rare tree from which the music resonates and thousands of devotees come here to visit.

References

Villages in Mathura district